USS Macabi (SS-375) was a  of the United States Navy, named for the macabi, a bonefish (Albula vulpes) living in tropical seas and off the American coasts as far north as San Diego and Long Island and reaching a length of .

USS Macabi (SS-375) 
Macabi was laid down 1 May 1944 by the Manitowoc Shipbuilding Company at Manitowoc, Wisconsin; launched 19 September 1944, sponsored by Mrs. Arthur S. Carpender, wife of Rear Admiral Carpender; and commissioned 29 March 1945.

Following trials on Lake Michigan, Macabi, on 19 April 1945, entered a floating drydock at Lockport, Ill., to transit the Chicago Canal to the Mississippi River, and arrived New Orleans 26 April `1945. Three days later she left for shakedown operations off Panama.

On 3 June 1945 Macabi departed Balboa, Canal Zone, for final training at Pearl Harbor before departing 9 July 1945 for the Caroline Islands via Guam, Marianas. She went on lifeguard station off Truk on arriving 21 July 1945. Some 10 days later Macabi was forced to dive to avoid two aerial bombs off Moen Island.

She returned to Apra Harbor, Guam, for repairs 4 August through 13 August 1945; and was on her way back to Truk when hostilities with Japan were terminated. Macabi was then ordered home, touching Pearl Harbor 27 to 29 August 1945 on the way. Arriving San Francisco 5 September 1945, she entered Mare Island Navy Yard 12 December 1945 for inactivation overhaul and decommissioned 16 June 1946.

ARA Santa Fe (S-11) 

Macabi was loaned to Argentina under the Military Assistance Program on 11 August 1960 and renamed ARA Santa Fe (S-11), while Lamprey was renamed ARA Santiago del Estero (S-12). The commander of Santa Fe was Capitán de Corbeta Julio A. Aureggi. The submarines left San Francisco on 23 September 1960, arriving at Mar del Plata Naval Base on 30 November of the same year. Santa Fe was struck from the US Naval Register, and sold outright to Argentina on 1 September 1971; after being employed as a training boat, she was decommissioned by the Argentine Navy and broken up for spare parts in 1974.

References

External links 

 

Balao-class submarines
Ships built in Manitowoc, Wisconsin
1944 ships
World War II submarines of the United States
Ships transferred from the United States Navy to the Argentine Navy